Chengbei Subdistrict is a subdistrict of Yingcheng in Xiaogan, eastern Hubei, People's Republic of China, located in the northern outskirts of the Yingcheng's urban area as its name suggests.

Administrative divisions
, it has 3 residential communities and 33 villages under its administration.

Communities:
Qixingqiao, Gaodujie, Xinjianjie, Zhaofan

Villages:
Changyan, Jiangxiang, Beishi, Wanqiao, Yangfan, C/Shengtan, Wulou, Gaoqiao, Sunyan, Fugang, Hanwan, Douhe, Zouguo, Liulin, Weihe, Xiaoliao, Niepo, Songpo, Lizui, Leishan, Wangmiao, Rehuo, Gonghe, Daihe, Xuhuang, Baima, Baiyang, Jidun, Hongtang, Xishi, Chapeng, Xingguang

See also 
 List of township-level divisions of Hubei

References 

Township-level divisions of Hubei